Yannick Bellechasse is a Saint-Martinois footballer who plays as a striker for Lymers FC and the Saint Martin national team.

International career 
Bellechasse scored a hat trick in the 2019–20 CONCACAF Nations League in League C play, in a 3-0 victory over the Cayman Islands.

International goals
Scores and results list Saint Martin's goal tally first.

International career statistics

See also 
 List of top international men's football goalscorers by country

References 

Living people
1992 births
Saint Martinois footballers
Saint Martin international footballers
Association football forwards